Jennifer Lee (born January 9, 1968) is an American sociologist and the Julian Clarence Levi Professor of Social Sciences at Columbia University. She was president of the Eastern Sociological Society from 2020–21. Lee was previously on the faculty of the University of California, Irvine. Lee is the author, co-author, or co-editor of four books: Civility in the City: Blacks, Jews, and Koreans in Urban America; Asian American Youth: Culture, Identity, and Ethnicity (co-edited with Min Zhou); The Diversity Paradox: Immigration and the Color Line in 21st Century America (co-authored with Frank D. Bean); and The Asian American Achievement Paradox (co-authored with Min Zhou).

Lee was born in South Korea and her family emigrated to the United States in 1971. She was educated at Columbia University, earning a BA in 1990, MA in 1995, and PhD in 1998, all in sociology.

She was named a fellow of the American Academy of Arts and Sciences in 2022.

Books 

 Civility in the City: Blacks, Jews, and Koreans in Urban America Published in 2002
 Asian American Youth: Culture, Identity, and Ethnicity Published in 2004  The Diversity Paradox: Immigration and the Color Line in Twenty-First Century America Published in 2010 
 The Asian American Achievement Paradox'' Published in 2015

References

External links
Official website

Living people
American women sociologists
Columbia College (New York) alumni
Columbia University faculty
University of California, Irvine faculty
1968 births
American sociologists
21st-century American women
Columbia Graduate School of Arts and Sciences alumni
Fellows of the American Academy of Arts and Sciences